Auchmophanes is a genus of moths of the family Erebidae. The genus was described by Turner in 1908. All three are known from the Australian state of Queensland.

Species
Auchmophanes megalosara (Turner, 1909)
Auchmophanes ochrospila Turner, 1908 
Auchmophanes platysara (Turner, 1929)

References

Hypeninae